Ahmed El-Said (born 15 April 1970) is an Egyptian boxer. He competed in the men's super heavyweight event at the 1996 Summer Olympics.

References

1970 births
Living people
Egyptian male boxers
Olympic boxers of Egypt
Boxers at the 1996 Summer Olympics
Place of birth missing (living people)
Super-heavyweight boxers
20th-century Egyptian people